Bhalerao is a surname native to the Indian state of Maharashtra.

Notable people
Parth Bhalerao; an Indian actor
Renuka Das Bhalerao; a general, a member of noble Rai Rayan family and the prime minister of Hyderabad 
Shamraj Bhalerao; a member of noble Rai Rayan family and Public Works Department member of His Exalted Highness Nizam's Executive Council
Rajaram Amrut Bhalerao; a doctor, professor, and patron of Marathi language theatre and Marathi literature in India.

References

Indian surnames